Riaan Walters (born 10 August 1980) is a Namibian cricketer. He is a right-handed batsman, who often plays as the opening batsman in the Namibian attack.
He played in two One Day Internationals in the Cricket World Cup in 2003, though he remained scoreless in both matches. He also played in the ICC Trophy between 2001 and 2005. In the 2001 tournament his misfield off the final ball of the final cost his side the Trophy.

External links

1980 births
Living people
Namibian cricketers
Namibia One Day International cricketers